Mahara  may refer to:

 Mahara, Sri Lanka, a town in Sri Lanka
 Mahara Electoral District (1960–1989)
 Mahara (surname)
 Mahara (software), an open source electronic portfolio system

See also
 Mahari (disambiguation)